Ridgewood High School, or RHS, is a public four-year high school located in Norridge, Illinois, an enclave suburb surrounded by Chicago, Illinois, in the United States. It is part of Ridgewood Community High School District 234.

The school serves portions of Norridge, Harwood Heights and unincorporated Norwood Park Township.

Athletics
Ridgewood competes in the Metro Suburban Conference and Illinois High School Association. Its mascot is the Rebel. Ridgewood has the following teams.
Men's Football
Men's Soccer
Men's Baseball
Men's Basketball
Men's Wrestling
Men's Volleyball
Women's Volleyball
Women's Softball
Women's Soccer
Women's Basketball
Women's Tennis
Track & Field
Cross Country
Cheerleading
Pom Poms

References

External links
 Official website

Public high schools in Cook County, Illinois
1969 establishments in Illinois